"The Virgin Carrying a Lantern" is a poem from Wallace Stevens's first book of poetry, Harmonium (1923). It was one of the few Harmonium poems first published in that volume.

Interpretation
This poem illustrates Edmund Wilson's maxim about reading Stevens, that even when you do not know what he is saying, you know that he is saying it well. It also illustrates a variant, that even when you have qualms about what he is saying, you know that he is saying it well. The image of the virgin carrying a lantern is crisp, contributing to a well wrought miniature. The role for the negress may be a racist stereotype. It is certainly more likely to be seen as such today than in 1923. Stevens surely meant it to be a playful poem, as the facile rhyme indicates.

Frank Doggett reads the poem as about the tension between conscious and unconscious, personified by the virgin and the negress respectively. "The virgin is the consciousness fulfulling its conventional roles by the light of its intelligence, the lantern," he writes, whereas the negress is the unconscious libido hidden among the flowers of sentiment, representing "the subliminal erotic life beneath the pieties and traditional obligations of the roles taken by the consciousness." Other readers may doubt that such a slight poem can bear this heavy load of Freudian theory.

Notes

References 
Frank Doggett, Wallace Stevens: The Making of the Poem. 1980: Johns Hopkins University Press.

1923 poems
American poems
Poetry by Wallace Stevens